Sümer Koçak (21 September 1961 – 5 August 2020) was a Turkish wrestler who competed in the 1984 Summer Olympics and in the 1988 Summer Olympics.

References

External links
 

1961 births
2020 deaths
Olympic wrestlers of Turkey
Wrestlers at the 1984 Summer Olympics
Wrestlers at the 1988 Summer Olympics
Turkish male sport wrestlers